A Woman of Mystery is a 1958 British crime film directed by Ernest Morris and starring Dermot Walsh, Hazel Court, and Ferdy Mayne. The film features an early performance from Michael Caine in an uncredited role.

Plot
Ray Savage, reporter for a sensational magazine in London is assigned over his objections to investigate a pretty blonde hat-check attendant's suicide. Inquiring at Jane Hale's place of work he learns that someone from her past had recognized her, and she was afraid. Finding a luggage label on her suitcase, he follows the lead to a dubious hotel where the manager tells him someone had taken a shot at her while she was staying there. From there he goes to her former place of work, then to the home of her friend at work who tells him that Miss Hale regularly called her mother, long distance. Following the number to a sanatorium where questioning Mrs. Hale yields nothing, but the cooperative administrator tells him the upscale neighborhood Jane was living before she went on the run.

Finally determining that she had been employed at an escort agency, he is so excited as to ignore the indications that he is being followed until he returns home to be attacked by three men who try to duplicate Miss Hale's supposed suicide by knocking him on the head and turning the gas on. Rescued by his girlfriend he grabs a gun and starts taking up housebreaking, until he determines the escort agency is cover for a counterfeiting operation. Then he shoots it out with the villains but feels frustrated because the mastermind behind the operation, the man who killed Jane, has apparently gotten away unseen. That doesn't last, because Jane's new boyfriend comes after Ray to try to kill him and Jane's friend who came to talk to Ray.

Cast
 Dermot Walsh as Ray Savage
 Hazel Court as Joy Grant
 Jennifer Jayne as Ruby Ames
 Ferdy Mayne as Andre
 Ernest Clark as Harvey
 Diana Chesney as Mrs. Bassett
 Paul Dickson as Winter
 Michael Caine Minor Role (uncredited)

External links

References

1958 films
1958 crime films
British black-and-white films
British crime films
Films shot at New Elstree Studios
1950s English-language films
Films directed by Ernest Morris
1950s British films